Biatan-e Sofla (also Romanized as Bīātān-e Soflá, Bayātān-e Soflá, Bayatan Sofla; also known as Bayātān-e Pā’īn, Beyātān-e Pā’īn, and Bīātān) is a village in Kamazan-e Sofla Rural District, Zand District, Malayer County, Hamadan Province, Iran. At the 2006 census, its population was 46, in 14 families.

References 

Populated places in Malayer County